Christian Themba Msimang is a South African politician who has served as a Member of the National Assembly since May 2019. He previously served in parliament from May 2009 until May 2014, and again from August 2014 to November 2017. Msimang is a member of the Inkatha Freedom Party.

Career
Msimang served as the deputy secretary-general of the Inkatha Freedom Party during the early-2000s.

Parliamentary career
Msimang was nominated to the National Assembly in the aftermath of the 2009 general election and was sworn in as a Member of Parliament on 6 May 2009.

He was placed low on the party's candidate list for the 2014 general election. As a consequence, he did not return to Parliament after the election. MP Mario Oriani-Ambrosini died on 16 August 2014 and the party appointed Msimang as his successor. He was sworn in on 23 August and later retired as an MP on 1 November 2017.

He returned to Parliament following the 2019 general election.

Committee memberships
Joint Constitutional Review Committee
Portfolio Committee on Justice and Correctional Services
Portfolio Committee on Small Business Development
Committee for Section 194 Enquiry (Alternate)

References

External links

Living people
Year of birth missing (living people)
Zulu people
People from KwaZulu-Natal
Inkatha Freedom Party politicians
Members of the National Assembly of South Africa